Frederick Perkins may refer to:
 Frederick Perkins (schoolteacher), Australian schoolteacher and Anglican minister
 Frederick Mason Perkins, American art historian, critic, and collector
 Sir Frederick Perkins (MP), British politician

See also
 Frederic Beecher Perkins, American editor, writer, and librarian
 Fred Perkins, American architect